Samuel O'Neil "Neil" Wilson (June 14, 1935 – February 20, 2013) was an American professional baseball player. He appeared in six games in Major League Baseball for the  San Francisco Giants as a catcher, starting in two games (on April 20 and 22).

Wilson was signed by the then-New York Giants in 1956. He spent parts of four years in the minor leagues before being on the opening day roster for the 1960 San Francisco Giants. Wilson and came to the plate eleven times, with no hits and one base on balls, before being demoted to the minors on April 26, 1960. He made one error in 23 chances defensively, with one passed ball. Wilson continued to play professional baseball through 1962 but never again appeared in the big leagues.

While playing for the Fresno Giants in 1958, he was named Most Valuable Player of the Class C California League after leading the circuit in hits (191) and batting average (.349).

References

External links 

Baseball Almanac

1935 births
2013 deaths
Baseball players from Tennessee
Corpus Christi Giants players
Fresno Giants players
Hawaii Islanders players
Major League Baseball catchers
Muskogee Giants players
People from Lexington, Tennessee
San Francisco Giants players
Tacoma Giants players
Vancouver Mounties players